Asbestovsky or Asbestovskiy is a rural locality (a settlement) under the administrative jurisdiction of the town of Alapayevsk, Sverdlovsk Oblast, Russia. It lies roughly 100 kilometres northeast of Yekaterinburg.

Economy
It contains a crush stone plant and a polytechnic. It is also a centre for the logging industry.

Notable people
Pavel Ivatov, an engineer and politician was born in Asbestovsky on  April, 12, 1950.

References

Rural localities in Sverdlovsk Oblast